Nathalie Lemmens (born 12 March 1995) is a Belgian volleyball player. She is part of the Belgium women's national volleyball team.

She competed at the 2015 FIVB Volleyball World Grand Prix,  2017 FIVB Volleyball World Grand Prix,  and 2018 FIVB Volleyball Women's Nations League.
On club level she plays for Asterix AVO Beveren.

Clubs

References

External links 
 Player profile FIVB
 Player profile, CEV
 

1995 births
Living people
Belgian women's volleyball players
Place of birth missing (living people)
Middle blockers
21st-century Belgian women